This is a List of World Championships medalists in sailing in yacht classes.

All ISAF International Sailing Federation Classes are entitled to hold World Championships the only recognised World Championships held outside these classes for yachts are the ISAF Offshore Team Racing World Championship and those conducted by the Offshore Racing Congress.

 Class 40
 Farr 30
 Farr 40
 Farr 45
 International Maxi Class
 Mumm 36
 Sydney 40
 Swan 45
 TP52
 X-35
 X-41
 X-99

See also
World Sailing
World championships in sailing

External links
Sailing competitions

Yacht